Events from the year 1626 in Denmark.

Incumbents 
 Monarch – Christian IV

Events

 27 August  The Battle of Lutter.
 25 April  The Battle of Dessau Bridge.

Undated
  Christian IV initiates the construction of Sankt Annæ Skans on the coast north of Copenhagen.
 Hans Poulsen Resen succeeds Christen Sørensen Longomontanus as rector of the University of Copenhagen.

Births
 6 April  Ole Borch,  scientist, physician, grammarian, and poet (died 1690)
 15 July Christiane Sehested, daughter of Christian IV (died 1670)
 15 July  Hedevig Ulfeldtm daughter of Christian IV (died 1678)

Full date missing
 Christian Foss, physician and Supreme Court justice (died 1680)
 Abel Cathrine, courtier and philanthropist (died 1787)

Deaths

Full date unknown
 Hans Nielsen, composer (born 1559)

References 

 
Denmark
Years of the 17th century in Denmark